In theoretical physics, dimensional deconstruction is a method to construct 4-dimensional theories that behave as higher-dimensional theories in a certain range of higher energies. The resulting theory is a gauge theory whose gauge group is a direct product of many copies of the same group; each copy may be interpreted as the gauge group located at a particular point along a new, discrete, "deconstructed" (d+1)st dimension. The spectrum of matter fields is a set of bifundamental representations expressed by a quiver diagram that is analogous to lattices in lattice gauge theory.

"Deconstruction" in physics was introduced by  Nima Arkani-Hamed, Andy Cohen and  Howard Georgi, and independently by Christopher T. Hill, Stefan Pokorski and Jing Wang.  Deconstruction is a lattice approximation to the real space of extra dimensions, while maintaining the full gauge symmetries and yields the low energy effective description of the physics.  This leads to a rationale for extensions of the Standard Model based upon product gauge groups, such as anticipated in
"topcolor" models of electroweak symmetry breaking.   The little Higgs theories are also examples of phenomenologically interesting models inspired by deconstruction.  Deconstruction is  used in a supersymmetric context to address the hierarchy problem and model extra dimensions. 
"Clock models," which have become popular in recent years in particle physics, are completely equivalent to deconstruction.

References
 
 

Theoretical physics
Physics beyond the Standard Model